Pattapola Ihala Grama Niladhari Division is a Grama Niladhari Division of the Hatharaliyadda Divisional Secretariat of Kandy District of Central Province, Sri Lanka. It has Grama Niladhari Division Code 342.

Pattapola Ihala is a surrounded by the Kirimetiya Watta, Thismada, Alagalla Pahalagama, Andiyathenna, Pattapola Pahalagama, Mudagammana, Meegasthenna and Welivita Pahalagama South Grama Niladhari Divisions.

Demographics

Ethnicity 
The Pattapola Ihala Grama Niladhari Division has a Sinhalese majority (97.1%). In comparison, the Hatharaliyadda Divisional Secretariat (which contains the Pattapola Ihala Grama Niladhari Division) has a Sinhalese majority (92.9%)

Religion 
The Pattapola Ihala Grama Niladhari Division has a Buddhist majority (100.0%). In comparison, the Hatharaliyadda Divisional Secretariat (which contains the Pattapola Ihala Grama Niladhari Division) has a Buddhist majority (92.9%)

References 

Grama Niladhari Divisions of Hatharaliyadda Divisional Secretariat